Nichita Danilov (born April 7, 1952, in Climăuţi village, Suceava County) is a Romanian poet. He served as the acting ambassador of Romania to Moldova in 1999.

Early life
Danilov graduated from the Architecture College and the Faculty of  Economics in Iași. He made his debut in the Dialog literary review with a selection of poems.

Published works
 Cartesian Wells (Fîntîni carteziene), Junimea Publishing House, 1980
 Black Field (Cîmpul negru), Cartea Romaneasca Publishing House, 1982
 Harlequins by the Edge of the Field (Arlechini la marginea cîmpului), Cartea Romaneasca Publishing House, 1985
 Poems (Poeme), Junimea Publishing  House, 1987; Over Things, Nothingness, (Deasupra lucrurilor, neantul), Cartea Romaneasca Publishing House, 1990
 Over Things, Nothingness – Au-Dessus Des Choses, Le Neant, (bilingual edition Romanian- French translated by Emanoil Marcu), Editura Axa, 1997, Botosani
 Ragged Ear (Urechea de cîrpă), short stories and pamphlets, Boema, 1993
 Cardboard Apocalypse (Apocalipsa de carton), essays, Institutul European  Publishing House 1995
 The Blind Bridegroom (Mirele orb), poems, Moldova Publishing House, 1996
 Hans Wife (Nevasta lui Hans), prose, Moldova Publishing House, 1996
 Scene with  walls and doors (Peisaj cu ziduri și uși, bilingual edition Romanian- English, translated by Sean Cotter, SUA), poems, 2000, Augusta Publishing House
 Souls from Second Hand (Suflete la Second Hand), poems, 1999, Vinea Publishing House, 2000
 In the desert and on the waters (În deșert și pe ape), poems, Prut International Publishing House 2001

Danilov's poems can also be found in the Anthology of Romanian Poets edited by Laurențiu Ulici, Anthology of the Poetry of the Generation of the 80s, edited by Alexandru Musina, Anthology of Romanian Poetry from Its Origins to the Present Time, edited by Dumitru Chioaru and Radu Văcărescu, The Romanian Writers' Dictionary, edited by the Romanian Academy, Contemporary Poetry, edited by Marin Mincu a.s.o. Some of his poems have been translated in other languages and published in several anthologies or literary magazines, or example Hungary, USA, Great Britain, Czechoslovakia, Spain, France, Latvia. Adam J. Sorkin, Sean Cotter, Brenda Walker, Elena Loghinovski, Maria Dinescu, Leons Briedis, Emanoil Marcu, Lidia Nasinek are some translators that have translated his poems.

He is editor-in-chief of the bilingual (Romanian-Russian) literary magazine Kitej-grad and the main manager of the Iaşi Cultural House. He also works as a journalist for Ziarul de Iaşi. He is also a member of the Writers' Union of Romania (since 1980), a COPYRO member, and also a European PEN Club member.

Awards and honors 
Danilov has been awarded several honors, including prizes from the Writers' Union of Romania (1980), the Iaşi Writers' Association (1982, 1985, 1991, 1995), the Soros Foundation Award (1995), and the Writers' Union of Moldova (1997, 2000).

External links

 Official site

1952 births
People from Suceava County
Writers from Iași
Ambassadors of Romania to Moldova
Living people
Alexandru Ioan Cuza University alumni
Romanian people of Russian descent